An associate justice of the Supreme Court of the Philippines is one of fifteen members of the Supreme Court of the Philippines, the highest court in the Philippines. The Chief Justice presides over the high court, but carries only one of the 15 votes in the court. Traditionally, the Chief Justice is deemed primus inter pares ("first among equals") among the justices.

Until 1973, only men were appointed as Associate Justices to the Court. Cecilia Muñoz-Palma, an appointee of President Ferdinand Marcos, was the first woman to sit on the Court. Since then, 15 other women have been appointed as Associate Justices of the Supreme Court. The most recent woman to be appointed to the high tribunal is Ma. Filomena D. Singh, a former Justice of the Court of Appeals of the Philippines on May 18, 2022.

Current associate justices 
, there are fourteen associate justices on the Supreme Court, with the most recent appointment being that of Maria Filomena Singh on May 18, 2022.

The justices, ordered by seniority, are:

Constitutional requirements and limitations

Under the 1987 Constitution, the minimum requirements for appointment to the Supreme Court are natural born citizenship; 40 years of age; and 15 years or more as a judge of a lower court or engaged in the practice of law in the Philippines. (sec. 7(1), Article VIII) The members of the Court are appointed by the President from a list of at least 3 nominees prepared by the Judicial and Bar Council. (sec. 9, Article VIII) The appointment is not subject to confirmation by Congress.

Members of the Court are mandated to retire upon reaching the age of 70. (sec. 11, Article VIII) They may also be removed from office through impeachment, which is accomplished through a resolution of impeachment affirmed by a 1/3 vote of all members of the House of Representatives and conviction by 2/3 vote of all members of the Senate.

Since 1901, there has always been only one Chief Justice. In contrast, the number of Associate Justices has wildly varied. From the original number of six (1901–1916), this was increased to eight (1916–1935), then to ten (1935–1940). During the years 1940–1945, the membership varied from five to seven. After liberation in 1945, the number was reset to ten, and the current number of fourteen was first set in place with the enactment of the 1973 Constitution. During the first few months of the Aquino administration, ten Associate Justices sat on the Court, but the appointment of Carolina Griño-Aquino in February 1988 finally restored the number of Associate Justices at fourteen.

Official functions

The cases decided by the Supreme Court involve several classes of disputes. Most prominently, the Court is called upon to exercise the power of judicial review of presidential or legislative actions. More often, the Court also undertakes appellate review of decisions of the trial courts and the Court of Appeals in civil and criminal cases. The Court is also tasked with deciding administrative cases involving members and employees of the judiciary and of lawyers belonging to the Philippine Bar. The decisions of the Court become part of the law of the land.

Each Justice carries one vote on the Court which they exercise whether when sitting in Division, or in the full complement of 15 (or "en banc"). Since the 1970s, the Supreme Court has sat in three divisions, with five Justices as members of each division. As most Supreme Court cases are decided by the division rather than the en banc, a vote of three Justices sitting in a division is usually sufficient to decide the case. However, the Constitution prescribes instances whereby a case must be decided en banc, such as in declaring a law as unconstitutional or when a judicial precedent is overturned. Each vote can be crucial, as recently shown in the 2006 People's Initiative case (Lambino v. COMELEC), which was decided en banc by an 8–7 vote.

As a case is decided, one justice in the majority is assigned to write the majority opinion for the Court. Even as these decisions speak in behalf of the Court, the writer of the opinion (known as the "ponente") is strongly identified with the decision, and the body of opinions of each Justice enhances his/her reputation. Many important opinions are analyzed in law schools and are well-remembered long after the Justice had left the Court. For example, several of the opinions of Associate Justice Jose P. Laurel were crucial in the development of Philippine jurisprudence and are widely read and quoted nearly 70 years after they had been written.

Any other Justice, whether they be in the majority or in the minority, is entitled to write a separate opinion in a case to clarify his/her views, or even to challenge the points raised in the majority opinion. In the 1973 case of Javellana v. Executive Secretary, concerning the ratification of the 1973 Constitution, each Justice chose to write a separate opinion, while more recently, the 2005 decision on the Expanded VAT Law (Abakada v. Executive Secretary) saw 11 separate opinions. The separate opinions of a Justice in the majority is usually known as a "concurring opinion", while one penned by a Justice in the minority is known as a "dissenting opinion". A Justice who only partially agrees with the majority opinion while disagreeing with portions thereof may even write a "concurring and dissenting opinion".

While these separate opinions do not receive as much public attention as majority opinions, they are usually studied in the legal academe and by other judges. On several occasions, views expressed in a dissenting or concurring opinion were adopted by the Supreme Court in later years. Justice Gregorio Perfecto, whose staunch libertarian views were out of sync with the Cold War era, wrote over 140 dissenting opinions in just 4 years. Years after his death, some of his views in dissent, such as in Moncado v. People's Court (1948) were adopted by a more liberal Supreme Court.

The rule of seniority

The Associate Justices of the Court are usually ordered according to the date of their appointment. There are no official ramifications as to this ranking, although the order determines the seating arrangement on the bench and is duly considered in all matters of protocol. Within the discretion of the Court, the ranking may also factor into the composition of the divisions of the Court.

In 1986, the order of seniority in the Court was modified upon the assumption to the presidency of Corazon C. Aquino. President Aquino had sought to reorganize the Court by obtaining the resignation of most of the Associate Justices who had been appointed by Ferdinand Marcos, and filling those vacancies with her own choices. Eventually, Aquino chose to re-appoint three Marcos-appointed Justices: Ameurfina A. Melencio-Herrera, Hugo E. Gutierrez, Jr. and Nestor B. Alampay, but did so only after appointing several new Justices to the Court. The previous service of these three were not considered for the purposes of determining seniority. This point would cause a minor controversy in 1992. During that time, it was advocated in some sectors that Herrera, as the longest serving incumbent Associate Justice, was more qualified to succeed the resigned Chief Justice Marcelo B. Fernan than Andres R. Narvasa, who was considered as the Senior Associate Justice despite having been appointed to the Court 7 years after Melencio-Herrera. President Aquino eventually appointed Narvasa over Herrera.

The incumbent Justice with the earliest date of appointment is deemed the Senior Associate Justice. The Senior Associate Justice has no constitutional or statutory duties, but usually acts as Acting Chief Justice during the absence of the Chief Justice. The Senior Associate Justice is also usually designated as the chairperson of the second division of the Court.

The following became Senior Associate Justices in their tenure in the Supreme Court:

Becoming chief justice

Only two persons appointed as Chief Justice had not previously served as Associate Justices. These were Cayetano Arellano, the first Chief Justice, and Jose Yulo, the former Speaker of the House of Representatives who was appointed as Chief Justice during the Japanese period. All other Chief Justices, except for Victorino Mapa, were incumbent Associate Justices at the time of their appointment as Chief Justice. Mapa had served as Associate Justice from 1901 to 1913, when he was appointed as Secretary of Justice. Mapa would be appointed as Chief Justice in 1920.

Another tradition, though less stringently observed, was that the most senior Associate Justice would be appointed as Chief Justice upon a permanent vacancy to that post. Deviations from this tradition, especially in recent years, have caused some controversy. Senior Associate Justice Claudio Teehankee, who had emerged as a fervent critic of Ferdinand Marcos, was twice bypassed for Chief Justice by Marcos. More recently, in 2005, the appointment of Artemio Panganiban as Chief Justice over Senior Associate Justice Reynato Puno was also the subject of some controversy. Puno was eventually appointed as Chief Justice in 2006. Another contender for Chief Justice in 2006 was Senator Miriam Defensor Santiago. Had Santiago been appointed Chief Justice, she would have been the first person since Jose Yulo in 1942 to have been appointed Chief without serving as Associate Justice. When Justice Renato Corona assumed as Chief Justice on May 17, 2010, the most senior Associate Justice was Antonio Carpio, who was appointed to the Court in October 2001, 6 months before Corona's own appointment.

List of associate justices

Living former associate justices

The most recent death of a former justice was that of Antonio Nachura, who died on March 13, 2022, aged 80 years, 273 days.

See also

 Supreme Court of the Philippines
 Chief Justice of the Supreme Court of the Philippines
 Judicial and Bar Council
 Constitution of the Philippines
 Court of Appeals of the Philippines
 Court of Tax Appeals of the Philippines
 Sandiganbayan

References 
 The Supreme Court E-library

Notes

Supreme Court of the Philippines